Albert Rösti (born 7 August 1967) is a Swiss entrepreneur, association official and politician who has been a Member of the Swiss Federal Council since 1 January 2023. He previously presided over the Swiss People's Party (SVP/UDC) from 2016 to 2020 and served as a member of the National Council for the canton of Bern from 2011 until 2022. Rösti resides in Uetendorf near Thun.

Biography
Albert Rösti grew up in Kandersteg, Bern and studied agronomy at ETH Zurich. He graduated in 2002 to study at the University of Rochester as a Master of Business Administration.

Rösti entered the Bern Department of Economic Affairs in 1998, and he served as Deputy Secretary General from 2001 to 2003 and as Secretary General from 2003 to 2006. He then became the director of Swiss Milk Producers. Since 2013 he is owner and manager of the business and politics consulting firm Büro Dr. Rösti GmbH.

From 2007 to 2014, Rösti was president of the Agricultural Information Service (LID). In May 2014. He was elected as the president of Action for a Sensible Energy Policy Switzerland (AVES). In May 2015, Rösti replaced Caspar Baader as the president of Swiss Oil, the Swiss association of fuel traders.

Rösti lives in Uetendorf, is married, and has two children.

Political career
From 2000 to 2007, Rösti served as the president of Uetendorf chapter of the SVP. Since January 2008 he was a member of the local council of Uetendorf, and in 2014 he became the mayor of Uetendorf, replacing Hannes Zaugg-Graf.

Rösti ran unsuccessfully in 2010 in the Bernese Government elections. He was first elected in the 2011 Swiss federal election to the National Council. For the 2015 Swiss federal election, Rösti 2015 was the campaign manager of the SVP for the federal elections, and he ran unsuccessfully for the Council of States for Bern. Rösti served in the National Council until December 31, 2022.

In November 2015, the Bern chapter of the SVP nominated Rösti as a candidate for the Swiss Federal Council for the 2015 elections, but he withdrew his candidacy for the Council two weeks later.

On 23 April 2016, Rösti was unanimously elected as the Chairman of the SVP, replacing retiring Chairman Toni Brunner. He resigned from the party leadership in 2020 after the election of Marco Chiesa.

On 7 December 2022, Rösti was elected to the Federal Council in the 2022 Swiss Federal Council election, replacing Ueli Maurer. He assumed office on 1 January 2023.

References

External links

Biographical entry on the Federal Parliament website 
Personal homepage 

|-

1967 births
Living people
People from the canton of Bern
ETH Zurich alumni
University of Rochester alumni
Swiss People's Party politicians
Members of the National Council (Switzerland)
Members of the Federal Council (Switzerland)